This is a list of gliders/sailplanes of the world, (this reference lists all gliders with references, where available) 
Note: Any aircraft can glide for a short time, but gliders are designed to glide for longer.

F

FAG Chemnitz 
(Flugtechnischen Arbeitsgemeinschaft der Staatlichen Akademie für Technik – Chemnitz)
 FAG Chemnitz C-1
 FAG Chemnitz C-2
 FAG Chemnitz C-3
 FAG Chemnitz C-4
 FAG Chemnitz C-5
 FAG Chemnitz C-6
 FAG Chemnitz C-7
 FAG Chemnitz C-8
 FAG Chemnitz C-9
 FAG Chemnitz C-10
 FAG Chemnitz C-11

FAG Esslingen 
(Flugtechnischen Arbeitsgemeinschaft der Staatlichen Akademie für Technik – Esslingen)
 FAG Esslingen E-01
 FAG Esslingen E-02
 FAG Esslingen E-03
 FAG Esslingen E-04
 FAG Esslingen E-05
 FAG Esslingen E-06
 FAG Esslingen E-07
 FAG Esslingen E-08
 FAG Esslingen E-09
 FAG Esslingen E-10
 FAG Esslingen E-11
 FAG Esslingen E-12
 FAG Esslingen E-14

FAG Stettin 
(Flugtechnischen Arbeitsgemeinschaft der Staatlichen Akademie für Technik – Stettin)
 FAG Stettin 4

FAR Musachevo
(FAR Musachevo)
 FAR Musachevo Yastreb – ВСР Мусачево Ястреб
 FAR Musachevo Komet

Farman 
(Henry Farman)
 Farman Aviette
 Farman Moustique
 Farman Sport-P

Farner 
(Hans U. Farner / Aviafiber / Canard Aviation AG / Hans U. Farner & Heinrich Bucher / Bucher Leichtbau)
 Farner HF Colibri 1 SL
 Aviafiber Canard 2FL
 Bucher Canard 2FL - Bucher Leichtbau
 Canard Aviation Canard SC
 Canard Aviation Canard SCM

Farner 
(Willy Farner)
 Farner WF-1
 Farner WF-2
 Farner WF-23P
 Farner WF-3
 Farner WF-5 Elmer Citro
 Farner WF-6
 Farner WF-7
 Farner WF-8

Farrar
(Demetrius F. Farrar Jr.)
 Farrar LSG-1 Bird Flight Machine
 Farrar V-1 Flying Wing
 Farrar XI

Fasola
(Néstor A. Fasola)
 Fasola NF-1
 Fasola NF-2
 Fasola NF-3 Beta
 Fasola-Crego Vector

Fauvel
(Charles Fauvel)
 Fauvel AV.1
 Fauvel AV.2
 Fauvel AV.3
 Fauvel AV.7
 Fauvel AV.10
 Fauvel AV.14
 Fauvel AV.17
 Fauvel AV.22
 Fauvel AV.221
 Fauvel AV.222
 Fauvel AV.28
 Fauvel AV.29
 Fauvel AV.30
 Fauvel AV.31
 Fauvel AV.32
 Fauvel AV.33
 Fauvel AV.35
 Fauvel AV.36
 Fauvel AV.361
 Fauvel AV.37
 Fauvel AV.42
 Fauvel AV.44
 Fauvel AV.45
 Fauvel AV.451
 Fauvel AV.46
 Fauvel AV.48
 Fauvel AV.50
 Fauvel AV.60
 Fauvel AV.61

FAB
(Flugtechnische Arbeitsgemeinschaft an der Ingenieurschule Beuth)
 FAB 3 – Flugtechnische Arbeitsgemeinschaft an der Ingenieurschule Beuth

Fage
(Jacques Fage)
 Fage Dédale

Farrar-McFarlane
(D. J Farrar & L.G. McFarlane)
 Farrar-McFarlane biplace –

Favier
(L. Favier)
 Favier LF-3

Fabris (glider constructor)
(Fabris / Gabardini di Cameri)
 Febo Paglierini

Ferber
(Ferdinand Ferber)
 Ferber P-1
 Ferber N° 1	1898
 Ferber N° 2	1899
 Ferber N° 3	1899
 Ferber N° 4	1901
 Ferber N° 5 1902
 Ferber N° 5 1903
 Ferber N° 5 1904
 Ferber N° 6	1905

FFA
(Thomas Bircher & Jürg Von Voomfeld  / Flug- und Fahrzeugwerke Altenrhein AG)
 FFA Diamant 18
 FFA Diamant
 FFA HBV
 FFA Diamant 16.5
 FFA N-20.1 Arbalette - (Herbert Wiehl / Flug- und Fahrzeugwerke Altenrhein)

Fibera
(Ahto Anttila / Fibera)
 Fibera KK-1e Utu

Fisher-Boretzki
(Hans Fischer & Boretzki)
 Fisher-Boretzki Fibo 2a

Fizir-Mikl
(Rudolf Fizir & Josef Mikl)
 Fizir-Mikl glider

FFG Hannover 
(Flugtechnische FachGruppe an der Technischen Hochschule Hannover)
 Akaflieg Hannover AFH-04
 Akaflieg Hannover AFH-10

Flachsmann 
(Karl Flachsmann)
 Flachsmann F-1
 Flachsmann F-2
 Flachsmann F-5

Flight Dynamics
(Flight Dynamics Inc.)
 Flight Dynamics Seasprite
 Flight Dynamics Flightsail

Florida
(Florida University)
 Florida BDG-1

FMA
 Ae, for "Dirección General de Aerotécnica", on the first period (1927–1936);
 F.M.A., for "Fábrica Militar de Aviones", on the second period (1938–1943);
 I.Ae., for "Instituto Aerotécnico", on the third period (1943–1952);
 IA, meaning not specified

Focke-Wulf
 Focke-Wulf Kranich III

Fokker
(Fokker Flugzeug-Werke G.m.b.H)
 Fokker 1909 Spider glider
 Fokker V.30
 Fokker V.42
 Fokker 1919 single-seat biplane glider
 Fokker 1922 single-seat biplane glider
 Fokker two-seat biplane glider – 1922 Wasserkuppe
 Fokker D-8 (de-engined D.VIII)
 Fokker FG-1 – 1919
 Fokker FG-2 – 1922
 Fokker FG-3 – 1922
 Fokker FG-4 – 1922

Ford
(Gilbert Ford)
 Ford 1930 Primary
 Ford Bluey

Fournier
(Avions Fournier SA / René Fournier / Société Alpavia)
 Fournier RF-2
 Fournier RF 3
 Fournier RF 4 (motor glider)
 Fournier RF 5 (motor glider)
 Fournier RF-7 (motor glider)
 Fournier RF-9 (motor glider)
 Fournier RF-10 (motor glider)

Frankfort 
(Frankfort Sailplane Company / Stanley Corcoran)
 Frankfort Cinema I
 Frankfort Cinema II
 Frankfort Cinema II Glider B
 Frankfort TG-1
 Frankfort XCG-1
 Frankfort XCG-2

Franklin
(Franklin Glider Corporation)
 Franklin Primary
 Franklin 9491
 Texaco Eaglet
 Franklin PS-2
 Franklin-Stevens PS-2
 Stevens SU-1 
 Stevens-Franklin – Stevens Institute of Technology / Roswell Earl Franklin
 Franklin TG-15
 Franklin TG-17

Frati
(Stelio Frati / Aeroclub de Busto Arsizio, Varese)
 Frati BF-46

Free Flight
(Free Flight Aviation Pty. Ltd.)
 Free Flight Hornet 130s

Freel
(Charles L. Freel / San Diego High School)
 Freel Flying Wing

Freiherr von Lüttwitz
 Freiherr von Lüttwitz glider

FTAG Esslingen 
(Flugtechnische Arbeitsgemeinschaft an der Fachhochschule Esslingen -Hochschule für Technik e.V.)
 Esslingen E-2 a.k.a. FTAG E-2
 Esslingen E-3 a.k.a. FTAG E-3
 Esslingen E-4 a.k.a. FTAG E-4
 Esslingen E-8 a.k.a. FTAG E-8
 Esslingen E-9 a.k.a. FTAG E-9
 Esslingen E-11 a.k.a. FTAG E-11
 Esslingen E-12 a.k.a. FTAG E-12
 Esslingen E-14 a.k.a. FTAG E-14

Fukuda 
(Fukuda Kei Hikoki Seisakusho - Fukuda light Aeroplane Manufacturing Works)
 Fukuda Ki-24
 Fukuda Ki-26 
 Fukuda Hikara-6-I
 Fukuda Hikari Research-2 Motor Glider
 Fukuda/Hitachi HT-3 Research Glider

Fulda
(Modell-und Segelflugverein Fulda)
 Fulda Fulda
 Fulda Erlkönig

Funk
(Otto & Peter Funk)
 Funk HS203
 VFW-Fokker FK-3
 VFW-Fokker FK-5
 Funk Sirius 1
 Akaflieg Karlsruhe AK-1 (FK-4)
 Funk FK-1 Greif-1a
 Funk FK-1 Greif-1b
 Funk FK-2 Greif 2
 Funk FK-3
 Funk FK-4
 Funk FK-5
 Funk FK-6
 Funk FK-7
 Funk FK-8

FVA
(Flugwissenschaftliche Vereinigung Aachen)
 Fulda-Aachen Eva – Klemperer, Wolfgang – Flugwissenschaftliche Vereinigung TH Aachen und Modell- und Segelflugverein, Fulda
 FVA-1 Schwatze Düvel (Schwarzer Teufel)
 FVA-2 Blaue Maus
 FVA-3 Ente
 FVA-04 Pipö
 FVA-5 Rheinland
 FVA-07 M 1a
 FVA-08 MS II
 FVA-9 Blaue Maus 2
 FVA-10A Theodor Bienen
 FVA-10B Rheinland
 FVA-11 Eifel
 FVA-12
 FVA-13 Olympia Jolle
 FVA-14 Ringflügel
 FVA-15
 FVA-16 Schaumstoff-Flügel
 FVA-17 Nurflügler
 FVA-20 F.B. Schmetz
 FVA-27

FVD 
(Flugtechnischer Verein Dresden – H. Muttray & R. Siefert)
 Dresden Stehaufchen
 Dresden Doris
 Dresden D-B03
 Dresden D-B04
 Dresden D-B05
 Dresden D-B06
 Dresden D-B07
 Dresden D-B08
 Dresden D-B09
 Dresden D-B10

Flugtechnische Verein Stuttgart|FVS
(Flugtechnische Verein Stuttgart / Paul Brenner &  Martin Schrenk)
Also see Akaflieg Stuttgart
 FVS 4 - 1921 monoplane school glider Designed by Paul Brenner, head of FVS
 Stuttgart I
 Akaflieg Stuttgart I
 FVS Fox- 1922 monoplane school glider Designed by Brenner & Martin Schrenk
 Stuttgart II
 Akaflieg Stuttgart II

Notes

Further reading

External links

Lists of glider aircraft